Ellis Owusu-Dabo is a Ghanaian academic and Pro Vice-Chancellor of the Kwame Nkrumah University of Science and Technology.

Education 
Owusu-Dabo attended the St. John's School, Sekondi and then proceeded to St. Augustine's College (Cape Coast). He then had his BSc. Human Biology and MB ChB-Medicine and Surgery from the Kwame Nkrumah University of Science and Technology. He went on to obtain an MSc. in Health Services Planning and Management from the same institution. His admirable passion and commitment to academia and health motivated him further towards the acquisition of a PhD in Epidemiology and Public Health from the University of Nottingham, UK.

Career 
As Professor of Epidemiology and Global Health, his area of expertise is in Medical Epidemiology and applied public health technologies and is a former director of the Kumasi Centre for Collaborative Research. His research interest is in mainly non-communicable diseases in low-income country settings and also has considerable interest in population genomics of pulmonary tuberculosis. Ellis has secured and managed multimillion United States dollar research grants from principal granting institutions such as the European Union, National Institutes of Health, World Bank Group and the Bill & Melinda Gates Foundation as well as many bilateral organizations. He serves on several boards at both local and international levels. Owusu-Dabo has published over 200 research articles in peer-reviewed journals and is an international scholar at the Perelman School of Medicine at the University of Pennsylvania. He jointly developed patentable knowledge regarding the use of Granzyme B serum levels as biomarker to discriminate between sepsis and severe malaria (BNI009). He has been one of the leading voices on Ghana's Coronavirus fight in terms of advancing data-driven research on the subject. In September, 2022, he was re-elected as the Pro Vice-chancellor.

Awards 
Owusu-Dabo has received awards from the Africa Network for Drug and Diagnostic Initiative (ANDI), KCCR, Seeding Labs/Novartis, Teaching and Learning Innovation Fund (World Bank Award) and a PhD Fellowship from Cancer Research UK. He was awarded the Africa Role Model in Academic Excellence Lifetime Achievement at the 13th Transform Africa Conference & Africa Role Model Awards in September 2022.

Professional Memberships and Affiliations 
Owusu-Dabo is a fellow of the West African College of Physicians, Ghana College of Physicians and Surgeons and a member of the American Society of Tropical Medicine and Hygiene, Convention of Biomedical Research, Ghana (CobreG), Ghana Medical and Dental Council and the Ghana Medical Association.

Books and Selected Publications 

 Author, Book Chapter; Review of Non-Communicable Disease Epidemiology in Ghana, 2014
 Author, Seeing through the smoke: The Global smoking epidemic-a snapshot of smoking cessation trends, 2008

References 

Academic staff of Kwame Nkrumah University of Science and Technology
Living people
1968 births
St. Augustine's College (Cape Coast) alumni
Kwame Nkrumah University of Science and Technology alumni
Alumni of the University of Nottingham
Ghanaian public health doctors